Stein am Rhein railway station is a railway station in the Swiss canton of Schaffhausen and the municipality Stein am Rhein.

The station is located on the Lake railway line, which links Schaffhausen with Konstanz. It is served by Zurich S-Bahn line S29, which runs to and from Winterthur, and by the S1 of the St. Gallen S-Bahn, which operates over the Lake Line from Schaffhausen to  via St. Gallen.

References

External links

Stein am Rhein
Stein am Rhein
Stein am Rhein